Queen Sirikit Botanic Garden (QSBG) is a botanical garden in Mae Rim District, Chiang Mai Province, Thailand. It was opened in 1993 and is maintained under the auspices of the Botanical Garden Organization (BGO) of the Ministry of Natural Resources and Environment. Originally called the Mae Sa Botanic Garden, it was renamed for Sirikit, Queen of Thailand, in 1994.

The  site is home to twelve greenhouses, placing the establishment among Thailand's largest glasshouse complexes. Evergreen and dipterocarp trees occupy lower elevations, while pine forest is found in higher areas. QSBG displays plants and flowers year round. It was Thailand’s  first botanical garden built according to international standards. It focuses on strengthening ex situ conservation of valuable Thai flora. The breeding programs for native Thai orchids are some of QSBG's most prominent efforts.

Debuting in August of 2002, the glasshouse complex and network of greenhouses proudly maintains four ”seasonal” exhibition houses (which change according to time of year, plants’ blooming cycles, displaying of new plant arrivals, etc.), plus the eight main greenhouses, each one catering to specific plant families and growing conditions. These glasshouses include:

Tropical Rainforest House - home to many native Thai and Southeast Asian plants, such as bananas, gingers, and palms. 

Arid House - a hot and drier house, displaying plants from Cactaceae (as well as agave and many tender succulent plants), mainly from the Americas, including Mexico, Peru and Brazil. Additionally, African and Asian species of Euphorbiaceae are maintained, alongside numerous species of African aloe. This glasshouse also features mature cycads.

Orchids and Ferns House - This house features epiphytic and terrestrial orchids and ferns, with an emphasis on native Thai species. The orchid family encompasses around 25k species over 900 genera, with around 1,200 native to Thailand. Orchidaceae is one of the most successful plant families on Earth, as well as being one of the most widespread. The most common Southeast Asian varieties  are Dendrobium and Bulbophyllum. Many Thai orchids are under threat, from illegal wild-harvesting to a widespread loss of habitat, due to deforestation.

Aquatic House - over 100 species of aquatic and riparian plants, species that grow with their roots submerged, or partially submerged, on the banks of rivers, lagoons and other water bodies. One popular draw to this house are the massive water lilies Victoria amazonica, which are large enough for a small child or person to sit on comfortably. They block the sunlight underwater, outcompeting other species and enabling their own incredible growth.

To reach the glasshouses from the main entrance is potentially an hour’s walk, up steep and hilly pathways, which some garden enthusiasts enjoy; however, most guests prefer to drive up, using the paved access roads.

Affiliate gardens
In addition to QSBG, the BGO manages four other botanical gardens in Thailand: Romklao Botanical Garden (Phitsanulok Province), Rayong Botanic Garden (Rayong Province), Khon Kaen Botanical Garden (Khon Kaen Province) and Phra Mae Ya Botanic Garden (Sukhothai Province).

References

External links

QSBG website

Geography of Chiang Mai province
Environment of Thailand
Botanical gardens in Thailand
Tourist attractions in Chiang Mai province
1993 establishments in Thailand